Ákos Braun (born 26 June 1978) is a Hungarian judoka.

He was named Hungarian Sportsman of the Year for winning gold medals at that year's World and European Championships.

Achievements

References

External links
 

1978 births
Living people
Hungarian male judoka
World judo champions
21st-century Hungarian people